Guangji Bridge, also known as Xiangzi Bridge, is an ancient bridge that crosses the Han River east of Chaozhou, Guangdong province, China. A key cultural relic under national protection, the bridge is renowned as one of China's four famous ancient bridges, the other three being Zhaozhou Bridge, Lugou Bridge, and Luoyang Bridge.

There is an old saying, "", that means if you go to Chaozhou without visiting the bridge, you cannot say that you have been to Chaozhou. Mao Yisheng, a famous expert on the bridge, said, "A part of Guangji Bridge is connected by boats as a pontoon bridge. When it is open, there is a channel for ships and boats to get across. It can also be closed. Since it can be open or closed, it is a special case in the history of bridges in China." There are various pavilions on the bridge, so there is a popular saying, "twenty-four pavilions have twenty-four styles". The pavilions housed businesses. It was a prosperous time, so people said, "In one Li one the bridge, there is one Li of business market."

History 
Guangji Bridge was built by Zeng Wang, a magistrate under the Song Dynasty (1170). At that time, it was a floating bridge consisting of 86 large boats connected to one another. Its original name was Kangji Bridge.

In the year 1174 (Chunxi Year 淳熙元年间), it was broken up by flooding, so another magistrate, of Chang Wei prefecture, had workers start to reconstruct it, beginning with bridge piers on the west bank. By 1194, several magistrates of the prefecture—including Zhu Jiang, Wang Zhenggong, Ding Yinyuan, and Wang Shujin—had been involved in the construction of 10 bridge piers. Ding Yunyuan built the most piers; and for his outstanding achievements, the bridge was called Ding Gong Bridge. In 1194 (the 5th year of Zhaoxi, 绍熙五年), a magistrate of Shen Zongyu prefecture built a pavilion on the east bank and named the bridge Jichuan Bridge. Later, more magistrates became involved in its construction. By 1206 (the second year of Kaixi 开禧二年), 13 piers had been built.

After the construction of the east and west bridgeheads was completed, they were connected by some boats, which formed a bridge with the features of both a beam bridge and a pontoon bridge.

In the years between the late Song Dynasty and Yuan Dynasty, the surrounding area of the bridge was sometimes prosperous and sometimes poor. In 1435 (Ming Dynasty), a magistrate of a prefecture named Wang Yuan had it reconstructed. When it was finished, the west bridge had 10 piers supporting 9 spans and the east bridge had 13 piers supporting 12 spans, with 24 boats in between. There were 126 rooms in the pavilions on the bridge. The bridge was named Guangji Bridge.

In 1513 (the eighth year of Zhengde), another magistrate of a prefecture, Tan Lun, added a pier and removed six boats; and the Guangji Bridge then consisted of 18 boats and 24 piers. People described it as, "eighteen shuttle boats [and] twenty-four continents".

In 1724 (the second year of Yongzheng, Zhang Ziqian, magistrate of a prefecture, repaired the bridge and had two statues of oxen cast, one for the west bridge and the one for the east, which were meant to protect the bridge. In 1842, the eastern ox statue was lost to a flood. There is a folksong about it, which praises the beautiful scene of Guangji Bridge, describing 18 boats, 24 piers, 24 pavilions, and the 2 statues of oxen made of cast iron.

After over 400 years, the pavilions are gone, and the ox statue on the east pier washed away by floods. In 1958, a beam bridge supplanted the pontoon bridge. In 1989, another bridge was built to connect the east and west banks, which makes it possible to protect the ancient bridge. In 2009, Guangji Bridge, having been recently rebuilt, was re-opened.

In Chaozhou, there is a street called Paifang Street. Beside this street, there are the many archways of the bridge. One of the Chaozhou Eight Famous Scenes is of the rising river of Han River. Every year, the bridge attracts a large number of visitors. The construction of the Xiamen-Shenzhen Railway enabled a greater number of people to visit the bridge and learn the culture of Chaozhou.

Features 
This bridge has the features of a beam bridge, arch bridge, and pontoon bridge, which makes it unique in China. On the bridge, there were various rooms and pavilions, with ox statues on the west and east bridge. People did business on it, so it was also known as "In one Li one the bridge, there is one Li of business market".

Legends 
Each pier of Guangji Bridge has a history of several hundred years. From the Song Dynasty when the first one was built to the year when there were 24, it lasted over 300 years. In ancient times, with their backwardness, it was unimaginable that people could build such a long bridge. Therefore, there is a legend that it was fairies who constructed the bridge.
 
When Han Yu, a famous poet in the history of China, came to Chaozhou, he always climbed the Bijia mountain (now called Han Mountain). From the top of the mountain, he saw the river and the difficulty of crossing it, so he asked his nephew Han Xiangzi and a monk Guangji to build a bridge. Han Xiangzi built the east bridge. He invited eight fairies (八仙) to help him. Han Xiangzi himself climbed Fenghuang Mountain, in Chaozhou, for stones. He changed the stones into black pigs and chased them to the bridge. On the way, a woman cast a spell so the pigs changed back into the stones, which could not move. Consequently, several piers in the east were not built. In order to commemorate this, people named it Xiangzi Bridge.

Guangji the monk invited eighteen arhats to help him build the bridge in the west. He went on Sanpu Mountain to get stones. He changed the stones into cattle and sheep and chased them back. On the way, he met an evil landlord who tried to stop him and get his cattle and sheep. Guangji lost some cattle, so part of the bridge was not built. He Xiangu, a female fairy, dropped a lotus petal onto the river and changed it into 18 boats connecting the bridge. Guangji raised his cane and created chains to connect the boats together.

See also
 List of bridges in China

References

External links 

Guangji Bridge given a facelift, Xinhua News Agency, June 18, 2007.
Ancient bridge goes through refit, People's Daily, June 13, 2007.
Photos of Guangji Bridge on Panoramio
Lugou Bridge, China Daily, Sep 18, 2009
Photos of Guangji Bridge Night Lights Display, ShinyVisa, Dec 11, 2018

Bridges in Guangdong
Buildings and structures completed in 1170
Major National Historical and Cultural Sites in Guangdong
Bridges completed in the 12th century